Tulang Bawang Regency is a regency (kabupaten) of Lampung Province, Sumatra, Indonesia. The regency takes its name from the Tulang Bawang River which flows through the province.

Administrative districts
The Regency comprises fifteen districts (kecamatan) which are listed below with their areas and their populations at the 2010 Census and the 2020 Census.

History
Early Islamization Lampung from the XIII century from Pasai is evidenced by the tombstone of Malik Al Saleh written in 1297 and the Batu Brak Site at Hanibung in 688 Hijriyah. Islam was brought by the four sons of Sultan Ratu Ngegalang Paksi. The arrival of the four pious people is a setback from the Sekala Brak kuno with the last king, queen sekekhummong (Sekerummong), the Buay Tumi tribe, who is Hindu Birawa and animist. This momentum is at the same time a milestone in the establishment of Kepaksian Paksi Pak Sekala Brak or Kepaksian Sekala Brak which is based on Islamic religious values. The four sons of Umpu Ratu Ngegalang Paksi are Sultan Ratu Buay Pernong, Umpu Nyerupa, Umpu Belunguh, Umpu Bejalan Diway. The spread of Islam throughout the land of Lampung from the 15th century started from West Lampung Regency. In 1525 Islam also entered through Labuhan Maringgai from Banten and Palembang. The entry of Islam in Tulang Bawang since the 16th century from the village of Pagar the god of the Penggala Tulang Bawang area was brought Islamic traders.

The spread the Lampung tribe began in the 13th century AD since the marriage of the only daughter Queen sekekhummong nanely Sindi La Lalula in Islam with the descendants of kepaksian pernong who settled in Batu Brak, together with Putri Indar Wati (Sibulan) opened a new village in the area Tulang Bawang Regency new.

Tulang Bawang Regency was inaugurated by the Minester of Home Affairs on March 20, 1997, as a follow-up to Law no. 2 of 1997 concerning the establishment of the second level of Tulang Bawang and the Second Level District of Tanggamus.

Economy
Major crops include rice, orange (a growing sector), corn, cassava, soy bean and zallaca palm fruit. It is particularly known though for its shrimp industry.

References